Keith McNamara (born October 12, 1928) is a former member of the Ohio House of Representatives.

References

McNamara and the American Presidency Project 

Republican Party members of the Ohio House of Representatives
1928 births
Living people